is the name of several mountains in Japan.

Mount Kanmuri (Gifu, Fukui), located on the borders of Gifu and Fukui prefectures with a height of 
Mount Kanmuri (Matsuyama), located in Matsuyama, Ehime Prefecture 
Mount Kanmuri (Ehime, Kōchi), located on the borders of Ehime and Kōchi prefectures with a height of 
Mount Kanmuri (Ōita), located in Ōita Prefecture with a height of 
Mount Kanmuri (Hatsukaichi, Hiroshima), located in Hatsukaichi, Hiroshima Prefecture with a height of 
Mount Kanmuri (Kanagawa) (:ja:冠ヶ岳), located in Hakone, Kanagawa, Japan

See also 
Mount Kammuri